Jannick Jospin Gaopandia (born 19 April 1999) is a Central African footballer who plays as a midfielder for Anges de Fatima and the Central African Republic national team.

International career
Gaopandia debuted with the senior Central African Republic national team in a 4–1 2020 African Nations Championship loss to DR Congo on 20 October 2019.

References

External links
 
 

1999 births
Living people
People from Bangui
Central African Republic footballers
Central African Republic international footballers
Association football midfielders